Karpovka is a rural locality (a selo) in Kushtiryakovsky Selsoviet, Bakalinsky District, Bashkortostan, Russia. The population was 38 as of 2010. There are 3 streets.

Geography 
Karpovka is located 50 km southwest of Bakaly (the district's administrative centre) by road. Ursayevo is the nearest rural locality.

References 

Rural localities in Bakalinsky District